The Brigade of The Guards is a mechanised infantry regiment   of the Indian Army. It was raised as the first "all India", "all class" infantry unit of the Army where troops from all parts of India serve together, as opposed to other regiments that recruit from specific regions, ethnic groups or religions. 

The Brigade of The Guards distinguished itself by being awarded the most battle honours after Indian independence. The regiment was the brain-child of Field Marshal K. M. Cariappa, who was the first Indian commander-in-chief (C-in-C) of the Indian Army. He raised the Brigade of the Guards and coined the phrase; "The Guards, The Elite".

The President of India is the Honorary Colonel-in-Chief and the Chief of Army Staff is the Colonel-in-Chief of The Guards. The Guards Regimental Centre is at Kamptee in Maharashtra. The Brigade of The Guards was the senior most line infantry regiment of the Indian Army before its selection and conversion to the mechanised infantry role. It now holds the title of the senior most infantry regiment in an honorary/ceremonial capacity. Together with the Mechanised Infantry Regiment, they form part of the 'Mechanised Infantry' arm, which along with the Armoured Corps form the Mechanised Forces.

History and raising

The Brigade of Guards was raised in 1949 on the lines of the elite Guards units of the world, particularly, the Coldstream Guards of the British Army's Guards Division. The regiment was raised to implement the government's policy of encouraging Army recruitment from classes and regions which had been under-represented in the forces. Raised as The Guards Brigade, the old system of class composition was replaced with recruitment open to all regions, castes, creeds, and sections of society.

Prior to the raising of the Guards, Indian Army infantry regiments derived their name and troop composition from region, religion or sub-caste. There was a message with its formation that the country comes before everything else, including religion and caste. The regiment was formed as the first mixed class Indian regiment to be raised after Indian independence by Field Marshal KM Cariappa OBE. Three of the Army's oldest and most distinguished battalions were converted as Guards battalions in 1949: 
2nd Battalion, Punjab Regiment - 1st Battalion
1st Battalion, The Grenadiers - 2nd Battalion
1st Battalion, Rajputana Rifles - 3rd Battalion

A year later, they were joined by the 1st Battalion, Rajput Regiment as the 4th Battalion. It was the only regiment of foot guards in the Indian Army. Though the Brigade of The Guards is only 70 years old, its constituent battalions go back as far as 225 years and between them share 93 battle honours earned around the globe. 

From its raising till 1964, the Colonel of the Regiment was the serving Chief of the Army Staff. On 1 January 1964, Brigadier (later Lieutenant General) NC Rawlley became the first Colonel of the Regiment of the Brigade of the Guards. The Chiefs of the Army Staff continue to be the Honorary Colonels of the Brigade of Guards.

Currently the Brigade of the Guards consists of 19 regular battalions and 2 territorial battalions and 1 RR (Rashtriya Rifles) battalion. In the 1980s, the Indian Army began to increase the number of mechanized infantry battalions on its order of battle. As part of this program, the battalions of the Brigade of Guards were eventually converted to mechanized infantry.

Operations

1962 Indo-China War

1965 Indo-Pakistan War

1971 Liberation War

In the 1971 war, the Brigade of the Guards participated in actions on both the Eastern and the Western fronts.  The 14th Guards earned their first PVC ( Param Vir Chakra) through L/Nk Albert Ekka of Bravo Company, for heroism in the Gangasagar theatre:  he single-handedly turned the tide against Pakistani defenders firing downrange with LMG's and MMG's from the top of a fortified structure, putting the entire operation in jeopardy.

Operation Blue Star (1984)

This was an Indian military action carried out between 1 and 8 June 1984 to capture the extremist Sikh leader Jarnail Singh Bhindranwale and his followers along with demolition of the buildings of the Harmandir Sahib (Golden Temple) complex in Amritsar, Punjab.

The 10th battalion under Lt. Col. Ishrar Rahim Khan was located in Jalandhar in 1984 and moved to Amritsar to assist the civil administration. Along with 1 Para, 10 Guards moved in from the north entrance to the temple and, though suffering heavy casualties, achieved their objectives. The unit was awarded one Ashok Chakra (Capt. Jasbir Singh Raina), one Kirti Chakra and three Shaurya Chakras. Total casualties suffered by the unit were 19 killed and 50 wounded.

UN operations and counter-insurgency operations
One the first deployments overseas, both for this newly formed regiment as well as for the newly independent India, was to Indochina, where the 2nd Bn. was posted, in 1954, to support the International Control Commission: India was the lead-nation for the project, and from its own history was well-aware of how risky the task of Partition could be. Detachments of the battalion provided both security and an air of authority to the various subordinate headquarters in North Vietnam, South Vietnam, Laos and Cambodia, and the all-India regiment exemplified the national commitment to a fraught operation.

The Brigade of the Guards has also taken part in UN peace keeping operations in Gaza and Angola. 

The regiment has also been used in counter-insurgency operations within India.

Regimental battalions
The regiment currently consists of a total of 21 battalions. The majority of these operate as mechanized infantry, four operate in the reconnaissance and support role (in support of the border force), one is equipped as an anti-tank guided missile (ATGM) battalion and three (including two territorial army battalions) remain as infantry. Today, the regiment is one of three in the Indian Army that is made up of men from the different castes and regions of India.

The list of battalions is as follows:
1st Battalion  (former 2nd battalion, 2nd Punjab Regiment)
 2nd Battalion,  (former 1st battalion, 4th Bombay Grenadiers)
 3rd Battalion  (former 1st battalion, 6th Rajputana Rifles)
 4th Battalion  (former 1st battalion, 7th Rajput Regiment)
 5th Battalion (Reconnaissance & Support)
 6th Battalion
 7th Battalion
 8th Battalion
 9th Battalion
 10th Battalion
 11th Battalion
 12th Battalion (Reconnaissance & Support)
 13th Battalion
 14th Battalion (Param Vir Chakra)
 15th Battalion (Reconnaissance & Support)
 16th Battalion
 17th Battalion (Anti-Tank Guided Missile)
 18th Battalion
 19th Battalion (Reconnaissance & Support)
 20th Battalion
 22nd Battalion
 23rd Battalion

The Brigade of Guards has the following affiliations:

 21st Battalion, Rashtriya Rifles 
117th Battalion (Territorial Army) at Tiruchirapalli, Tamil Nadu
125th Battalion (Territorial Army) at Secunderabad, Telangana

Traditions

Regimental tune
The four senior battalions and the Guards Training Centre each have their own march past for the Pipes and Drums. The 1 GUARDS plays Nachtlager En Grenada, 2 GUARDS plays Back O’Benachie, 3 GUARDS plays With Wellesley’s Rifles at Keren, 4 GUARDS plays The Cock O’ the North, and the Guards Training Centre plays Hundred Pipers.  In 1966, the Brigade adopted the march past of the 2nd Guards Back O’ Benachie for the Pipes and Drums.  The Cariappa March was approved for the Brass Band of the  3rd Battalion and the centre in 1970.

Colours

1 GUARDS was the first and as of 2020, is the only battalion to receive Colours from the President of India in front of the Red Fort in New Delhi, with the colours being presented on 20 September 1962. The centre and the 2nd to 14th battalions received colours from President VV Giri at Kota on 16 March 1973. Battalions 15 to 19 were presented with colours by COAS General Gopal Gurunath Bewoor at Kamptee.

Gallantry awards
1 Param Vir Chakra, 2 Ashoka Chakras, 1 Padma Bhushan, 8 Param Vishisht Seva Medals, 6 Maha Vir Chakras, 4 Kirti Chakras, 46 Vir Chakras, 18 Shaurya Chakras, 77 Sena Medals, 10 Ati Vishisht Seva Medals, 3 Yudh Seva Medals, 16 Vishisht Seva Medals, 45 Mention-in-Despatches, 151 COAS's Commendation Cards and 79 GOC-in-C's Commendation Cards

Battle honours

Pre-independence
Delhi 1803; Egypt 1876–1917; British East Africa 1878; Afghanistan 1878–80; Kandahar 1880; Burma 1891; China 1900; East Africa 1914–1916; Mesopotamia 1914–1918, Egypt 1915, Gallipoli 1915, France and Flanders 1915, Kutal Amarah 1915; Palestine 1916-1918; Tigris 1916; Macedonia 1918; Afghanistan 1919; Donbaik 1943; Italy 1943–45; Burma 1945; J&.K 1947–1948;
Selinghar; Carnatic; Mysore; Ava; Pegu; Suez Canal; Nels, Krithia; Laos; Aden; Point-551; Kanghaw; Naushera; Mangalore; Hyderabad; Gaza; Megiodo; Nablus; Curais; Seringapatnam; Beurabone; Punjab; Mooltan; Persia; Reshire; Khooshab; Central India; Basra; Shaiba; Ctesiphon; Defence of Kut-Al-Amara; Sidi Barrani; Keren; Cassino; Castele Hill; Leswarree; Deig; Bharatpore; Khelat; Mahrakpore; Chilianwallah; Goojerat and Punjab.

Post-independence
Akhaura, Burki, Gadra Road, Hilli, Naushera, Gurais, Shingo River Valley, Sylhet and Ganga Sagar.

References

External links
BR Monitor Issue on the Brigade of the Guards

Military units and formations established in 1949
Guards regiments
Infantry regiments of the Indian Army from 1947